Dejan Dimitrovski (born 29 September 1979) is a retired football defender from North Macedonia, who was last played for FK Bregalnica Štip.
Throughout his career Dejan Dimitrovski was considered to be one of the best players in the Republic of North Macedonia and by the age of 21 he was already playing for the North Macedonian National Team.

International career 
He made his senior debut for North Macedonia in a July 2001 friendly match against Qatar and has earned a total of 6 caps, scoring no goals. His final international was a January 2002 Bahrain Tournament match against Finland.

References

External sources

1979 births
Living people
Association football defenders
Macedonian footballers
North Macedonia international footballers
FK Cementarnica 55 players
FK Bregalnica Štip players
KF Shkëndija players
Besëlidhja Lezhë players
Macedonian First Football League players
Gamma Ethniki players
Kategoria Superiore players
Macedonian expatriate footballers
Expatriate footballers in Greece
Expatriate footballers in Albania
Macedonian expatriate sportspeople in Greece
Macedonian expatriate sportspeople in Albania